Media Foundation is a COM-based multimedia framework pipeline and infrastructure platform for digital media in Windows Vista.

Media Foundation may also refer to:

 Adbusters Media Foundation, an anti-consumerist organization
 Educational Media Foundation, a radio broadcasting company
 International Women's Media Foundation, a journalism organization

See also

 Indochina Media Memorial Foundation
 Media Preservation Foundation